The following are the list of awards and nominations received by Wonder Girls, a South Korean girl group which debuted under JYP Entertainment in February 2007. They have received various awards and nominations throughout their career in South Korea and abroad, for works such as "Tell Me", "So Hot", and "Nobody".


Awards and nominations

Listicles

References 

Awards
Wonder Girls